"Razor" is a short story by the Russian writer Vladimir Nabokov. It was first published (as Britva) in the expatriate Russian literary magazine Rul' in 1926, but a French translation did not appear until 1991, and an English one (by Dmitri Nabokov, the writer's son) not until 1995.

Plot summary 

Ivanov, an exiled Russian and former military officer living in Berlin, has taken up employment as a barber; an apt position, Nabokov notes, as Ivanov's sharp facial appearance had earned him the nickname "Razor" in his earlier life. On a hot day, an unnamed character dressed largely in black enters the barber's, deserted save for Ivanov, and requests a shave. Ivanov quickly realises that the customer is a fellow Russian who, the reader gathers, tortured Ivanov during Russia's period of revolutionary upheaval. With the unnamed character sitting in the chair, his face lathered with shaving cream, Ivanov reminds him of their last encounter. Ivanov then proceeds to shave him, recounting their previous meeting while also strongly hinting at the effect that one slip of the razor could have. The reader half expects Ivanov to exact his revenge. But having told his story, Ivanov relents and the terrified and clean-shaven Soviet flees from the barber's.

Themes 

While only four pages long in the Penguin paperback edition (1997) of Nabokov's Collected Stories, the story touches upon many of the issues woven into Nabokov's longer works – the importance of an individual's freedom of action and thought, for instance, or the value of observing the life's particular details.

These issues are merged and illuminated through the prism of an even more important theme for Nabokov, that of the destruction of his Russian homeland by the Soviet Revolution. Countless numbers of his output evince a livid bitterness not only towards the revolution, but the succeeding ideology of the Communist empire – its police control, its suppression of personal freedoms, its attempts to rein in individual thought. Any character who dares support or favour Communism receives short shrift in Nabokov's work, and while not being a Communist could never be enough to guarantee a character a saintly status, it will save him or her from his withering disdain.

In "Razor" this contrast shapes Nabokov's entire characterisation. Ivanov, who made an "epic escape" from the revolution, is a positive figure, while the unnamed Soviet is viewed with immediate contempt. 

This contrast is most obviously developed in the plot itself. The one-time brutality of the Soviet is strongly suggested by his (past) actions. Ivanov, in contrast, refuses to descend to the methods of his former torturers. Having briefly raised the possibility of torture, enough to terrify the Soviet without inflicting lasting damage, Ivanov stops there. The razor does not slit open the Soviet's throbbing carotid. Cruelty does not beget further cruelty. Ivanov's melancholic realisation is that the pain of the past loss (not only the personal pain inflicted on him but the fact that "his vast, noble, splendid homeland had been ruined by some dull buffoon") will not be eradicated by revenge – Ivanov may not gain his physical retribution but he is assured of his moral superiority.

Nabokov employs a number of other techniques and themes to reinforce this contrast. For example, the characters' appearances. Ivanov's face is angular, almost harsh in its perspective: "nose sharp as a draftsman's triangle; chin sturdy as an elbow". Whereas Nabokov emphasises the roundness of the Soviet: "A puffy face ... with a plump mole by the right lobe of the nose." Ivanov applies lather to "the man's cheeks, rounded chin and upper lip." His eyes are "glittering little wheels". Later the Soviet's visage descends to being described as an "eyeless, fat face".

Nabokov continues to express his scorn for the Soviet, indicating how he is a figure easily manipulated by others; the inability of a character to express his free will is a considerable crime for Nabokov. So not only does the reader observe that the Soviet's every emotion at the whim of Ivanov ("when he pressed the flat surface of the razor to the man's neck, his entire body twitched") but in the final paragraph, Ivanov seems to be able to control his foe physically. Petrified by the possibility of revenge being meted out, the Soviet cannot move until Ivanov commands it of him. Having done that the Russian barber "clapped the bowler on his head, thrust the briefcase under his arm, and swivelled him toward the door." On leaving the barber's, descriptions of the Soviet further emphasise his robotic demeanour. Eyes completely shut, "he stepped like an automaton", "with the same mechanical gait" and "with an outstretched petrified hand". Each of these descriptions demonstrate the Soviet as being a non-individual, without free will, who can be manipulated and controlled by others. The political subtext of Nabokov's characterisation  – communists simply follow the herd rather than think for themselves – becomes clearer.

The theme of expression or rejection of individual choice Nabokov articulates in other ways. It is of course entirely deliberate that the Soviet is nameless, the name being a vital part of personal identity. Ivanov, on the other hand, has both an official name and a charismatic nickname.

A more subtle but perhaps fundamental aspect to Nabokov's delineation of his characters is that while Ivanov, spiritually free, escapes the view of others, the Soviet is already trapped under the others' gaze. How their faces and appearances are revealed to others becomes a defining characteristic of their personalities. The reader is told at the very start that Razor lacks a facade, and when acquaintances tried to recall his appearance they "could only imagine him in profile". Whereas as soon as the Soviet enters the barber, "the newcomer's reflection appeared in all the mirrors at once, in profile, three-quarter-face, and shown the waxen bald spot in back". The point is more subtle but important nevertheless - the free man escapes the view of others while the man who denies that freedom is forever trapped in the gaze of other people.

Use of detail and colour 

Detail and colour have a strong aesthetic effect in Nabokov's work, offering sharp reminders to both reader and character of the joy to be obtained from observation, however fleeting, of the world around them. Before the Soviet arrives, Ivanov observes "the glittering wheels of cars that left ribbon-like imprints on the heat-softened asphalt, resembling the ornate lacework of snakes." This and others are part of a joyous, seemingly childlike vision, in which inanimate objects are often anthropomorphised. The Soviet's reflection in the mirror showed that same "waxen bald spot ... from which the bowler hat had ascended to snag a hat hook". Once again, it is Ivanov who is rewarded with this joyous skill of observation, watching the passersby and cars, and then inside noting the "marble surfaces aglitter with green and gold scent bottles". The Soviet says and sees little in the story, another contrast that emphasises where the author's affections lie.

But this is not quite aestheticism for the sake of it – they are not extraneous things but are observations that shape and determine Ivanov's world. The barber notices the glittering wheels of the cars; a few minutes later he notices the Soviet's "minuscule eyes that glittered like the tiny wheels of a watch movement". The repetition of the glittering wheels motif is not a coincidence but reflects, however lightly, Ivanov's chain of thought; just as the wheels have left their impression on the asphalt, so the Soviet snake has left his imprint on Ivanov.

See also
Hernando Téllez, whose work "Lather and Nothing Else" has a very similar plot to "Razor"

1926 short stories
Short stories by Vladimir Nabokov
Works originally published in German newspapers